A list of films produced in South Korea in 2003:

Box office
The highest-grossing South Korean films released in 2003, by domestic box office gross revenue, are as follows:

A-H

I-Z

References

External links
 2003 in South Korea

 2003 in South Korean music
 2003 at www.koreanfilm.org

2003
Box
South Korean